Antonio Maria Bordoni (19 July 1789 – 26 March 1860) was an Italian mathematician who did research on mathematical analysis, geometry, and mechanics. Joining the faculty of the University of Pavia in 1817, Bordoni is generally considered to be the founder of the mathematical school of Pavia. He was a member of various learned academies, notably the Accademia dei XL. Bordoni's famous students were Francesco Brioschi, Luigi Cremona, Eugenio Beltrami, Felice Casorati and Delfino Codazzi.

Biography
Antonio Bordoni was born in Mezzana Corti (province of Pavia) on 19 July 1788, and graduated in Mathematics from Pavia on 7 June 1807.

After just two months he was appointed teacher of mathematics at the military School of Pavia, established by Napoleon, and held such office until 1816 when the school was closed due to the political situation of the times.

On 1 November 1817 he became full professor of Elementary Pure mathematics at the University and in 1818 he held the chair of Infinitesimal Calculus, Geodesy and Hydrometry, a discipline he taught for 23 years.

In 1827 and 1828 he was dean of the University itself. In 1854, as the Faculty of Mathematics of the University of Pavia (it previously belonged to the one of the Philosophy) was established, he was elected Director of Mathematical Studies and held such office until his death, which occurred 26 March 1860, just a month after being appointed senator.

Works

 Sopra l'equilibrio di un poligono qualunque. Memoria del signor Antonio Bordoni professore nella scuola militare di Pavia, Milano, Regia Cesarea Stamperia di Governo, 1814.
 Nuovi teoremi di meccanica elementare memoria del sig. A. Bordoni, inserita nell'ottavo tomo del Giornale di Fisica Chimica ec. del Sig. Brugnatelli, Pavia: dalla tipografia eredi Galeazzi, 1815.
 De' contorni delle ombre ordinarie trattato di A. Bordoni già prof. nella Scuola Militare di Pavia ed uno dei quaranta nella Società Italiana delle Scienze, Milano, Imperiale Regia Stamperia, 1816.
 
 
 Trattato di geodesia elementare di Antonio Bordoni, con 17 tavole, Milano, per P.E. Giusti fonditore-tipografo, 1825.
 Proposizioni teoriche e pratiche trattate in iscuola dal professore Antonio Bordoni e raccolte dal dottor Carlo Pasi, Pavia, dalla tipografia Bizzoni, 1829.
 Lezioni di calcolo sublime, Milano, per P. E. Giusti, 1831.
 
 Sulle svolte ordinarie delle strade in Opuscoli matematici e fisici di diversi autori, Milano, presso Emilio Giusti, 1834.
 Trattato di geodesia elementare, Pavia, dalla Tip. di P. Bizzoni, 1843

References

External links

History of Faculty of Engineering – Università di Pavia

1789 births
1860 deaths
19th-century Italian mathematicians
Mathematical analysts
Differential geometers
Academic staff of the University of Pavia